The Kommando Luftstreitkräfte/Luftverteidigung (Kdo LSK/LV) was the Air Force Staff - and simultaneously the Air Force Command of the National People's Army (NPA), the Air Force of the former German Democratic Republic.

The main task of the Kdo LSK/LV was to provide Command, Control and Communications (C3) to the military branch as the whole, as well as to the subordinated division-sized specified commands, groups, organizations, and units of the NVA's Air Force. Under deployment conditions, and in line with the situation awareness C3 had to be executed from the Main Air Force Operations Center, the so-called Zentraler Gefechtsstand 14 (ZGS-14) in Fürstenwalde, the Rear Operations Center (Rückwärtige Führungsstaffel - RFS) in Beeskow (Ranzig), or the Interim Operations Center (Hilfsführungsstelle - HFS) in Strausberg (Eggersdorf).

The Kdo LSK/LV was established in 1950, and was disbanded together with the NVA in 1990. Its legal successor was the 5. Luftwaffendivision of the Bundeswehr.

Command and organisation

Commanding generals of the Kdo LSK/LV NVA  
Source:

Organisation 
The command was composed by the following establishment:

 Deputy Minister and Commander-in-chief LSK/LV (3 star level) with the chief's office, flight planning and military advisor
 Deputy of the Commander LSK/LV (DC LSK/LV) and Chief of the Political Division (2 star level) with
 Three branches including Chief Party Control Commission (de: PKK), Central Party Leadership (de: ZPL), Spec-Propaganda, and Political Branch of the Kdo LSK/LV
 DC LSK/LV and Chief of Staff (CS) (2 star level)  with
 Assistant Chief Of Staff (ACOS) and A3 (1 star level)  with
 Branch 1 (4 sections; section EW, Counter Measures (de: GTAG), 3 radio electronic control vehicles; section military topography)
 Branch 2
 Combat Operations Center (de: GFZ)
 ACOS and Chief and Automation (de: GSA) (1 star level) with
 Branch Operations Centres (de: GS]
 Branch C2 Mechanisation and Automation, IT (de: MAT DV)
 Operations Training and Education Center (de: OTAZ)
 ACOS and Chief General Tasks with
 Staff company, guard company and vehicle company
 Chief A1 with PTA and WTA
 Chief Organization/Replenishment with
 Branch Organization
 Branch Replenishment
 Chief RECON
 Chief General-Military Training and Schools (de: AMAS)
 Chief A6 and ATC with
 Branches 1, 2 and 8th section
 Chief Mil Scientific (de: MiWi)
 Chief Chemical Services (de: CD)
 DC LSK/LV and Chief Military - and Transport Aviation (de. MTFK) (2 star level) with
 Chief Aviation Procurement and Maintenance (de: FID) (1 star level)
 Chief Front Aviation
 Chief Transport Aviation
 Chief Helicopter
 Search and Rescue (SAR), senior air traffic controller, parachute service
 DC LSK/LV and Chief Air Defence (2 star level) with
 Chief SAM Forces (de. FRT)
 Chief Fighter Air Craft Aviation (de: JFK)
 DC LSK/LV and Chief A4 (de. RD) (2 star level) with
 AC and CS A4 (1 Star level)
 Chief Medical Service
 Chief Combat Engineer Service
 Chief Military Architecture Accommodation (de: MBU)
 Chief Military Transport (de: MTW)
 Chief Closing and Equipment (de: BA)
 Chief Tactical Air Command and Control Service (TACCS) (de. FuTT) (1 star level) with
 Chief Engineering TACCS

 Safeguarding, counterintelligence, prevention of anti-state agitation
 Administration 2000: - This was the name for the Main Division I of the Stasi (Ministry for State Security), responsible for the National People's Army and the Border Troops

Subordination 
A decisive number of division-sized specified commands, groups, organizations, units and military formations have been under direct control of the Kommando LSK/LV.

Divisions and division-sized specified commands 
 Führungsorgan Front- u. Militärtransportfliegerkräfte (FO FMTFK)
 1. Luftverteidigungsdivision (1. LVD)
 3. LVD

Groups, organizations, units and military formations 
Units directly subordinated to the Kommando LSK/LV normally had numbers ending at 4. The first unit was -14, a second unit of the same kind was -24 etc.

 Amt für Luftraumkoordinierung (ALK), Berlin
 Auswerte-, Rechen- und Informationsgruppe 14 (ARIG-14), Fürstenwalde
 Chemische Werkstatt und Lager 14 (ChWL-14), Storkow, Brandenburg
 Druckerei 14, Strausberg
 Fla-Raketenwerkstatt und -lager 14 (FRWL-14), Pinnow, Brandenburg
 Fliegertechnisches Lager 14 (FTL-14), Krugau
 Flugplatz-Pionierbataillon 14 (FPiB-14) „Franz Dahlem“, Potsdam
 Flugzeugreparaturwerkstatt 14 (FRW-14), Cottbus
 Flugzeugreparaturwerkstatt 24 (FRW-24), Kamenz
 Institut für Luftfahrtmedizin (IfLM), Königsbrück
 Kfz-Instandsetzungswerkstatt 14 (KfzIW-14), Kamenz
 Kfz-Kompanie 14 (KfzK-14), Strausberg
 Kfz-Transportkompanie 34 (KfzTK-14), Krugau
 Kompanie Chemische Abwehr 14 (KChA-14), Waldsieversdorf
 Konditionsheim, Rugiswalde
 Konditionszentrum 14, Benneckenstein
 Labor für Treib- und Schmierstoffe 14, Cottbus
 Lazarett LSK/LV, Cottbus
 Militärtechnische Schule der Luftstreitkräfte/Luftverteidigung (MTS LSK/LV) „Harry Kuhn“ (Air and Air Defense Forces Technical Academy "Harry Kuhn"), Bad Düben
 Nachrichtenregiment 14 (NR-14) „Harro Schulze-Boysen“, Waldsieversdorf
 Nachrichten- und Flugsicherungs-Werkstatt und Lager 14 (NFWL-14), Cottbus
 Offiziershochschule für Militärflieger „Otto Lilienthal", Bautzen
 Fliegerausbildungsgeschwader 15 (FAG-15) „Heinz Kapelle“, Rothenburg/Oberlausitz
 Fliegertechnisches Bataillon 15 (FTB-15), Rothenburg
 Nachrichten- und Flugsicherungsbataillon 15 (NFB-15), Rothenburg
 Fliegerausbildungsgeschwader 25 (FAG-25) „Leander Ratz“, Bautzen
 Fliegertechnisches Bataillon 25 (FTB-25), Bautzen
 Nachrichten- und Flugsicherungsbataillon 25 (NFB-25), Bautzen
 Transportfliegerausbildungsstaffel 45 (TAS-45), Kamenz
 Fliegertechnisches Bataillon 45 (FTB-45), Kamenz
 Hubschrauberausbildungsgeschwader 35 (HAG-35) „Lambert Horn“, Brandenburg-Briest
 Fliegertechnisches Bataillon 35 (FTB-35), Brandenburg-Briest
 Offiziershochschule der Luftstreitkräfte/Luftverteidigung „Franz Mehring" (Air and Air Defense Forces Officer Cadet School), Kamenz
 Musikkorps der OHS der LSK/LV, Kamenz
 Pionierbataillon 24 (PiB-24) „Ludwig Renn“, Potsdam
 Pionierwerkstatt und -lager 14 (PiWL-14), Briest
 Rechenzentrale 14 (RZ-14), Strausberg
 Stabsmusikkorps der LSK/LV, Cottbus
 Technisches Versorgungslager 34 (TVL-34), Doberlug-Kirchhain
 Treib- und Schmierstofflager 14 (TSL-14), Hähnichen
 Treib- und Schmierstofflager 24 (TSL-24), Lohmen
 Treib- und Schmierstofflager 34 (TSL-34), Utzedel
 Treib- und Schmierstofflager 44 (TSL-44), Niederlehme
 Topographisches Lager, Stallberg
 Transportfliegergeschwader 44 (TG-44) „Arthur Pieck“, Diepensee/Marxwalde
 Fliegertechnisches Bataillon 44 (FTB-44), Marxwalde
 Verbindungsfliegerstaffel 14 (VS-14), Strausberg
 Fliegertechnische Kompanie 14 (FTK-14), Strausberg
 Vereinigte Hauptzentrale 14 (VHZ-14), Wünsdorf
 Versorgungslager 14 (VL-14), Görlitz
 Waffenwerkstatt und Lager 14, Bautzen
 Wartungseinheit 14 (WE-14), Ranzig
 Zentraler Gefechtsstand 14 (ZGS-14), Fürstenwalde/Spree

References

External links 
 Übersicht zu den DDR-Luftstreitkräften auf www.ddr-luftwaffe.de

Air Forces of the National People's Army
1950 establishments in East Germany
Military units and formations established in 1950
Military units and formations disestablished in 1990
Germany, East